Milan is a town in Franklin and Washington townships, Ripley County, in the U.S. state of Indiana. The population was 1,899 at the 2010 census.

Milan High School won the Indiana state basketball championship against Muncie Central High School in 1954, the victory being significant as Milan was one of the smallest towns to win a state championship in the United States at that time. The 1986 film Hoosiers is based on the story of the 1954 Milan Team.

While it is often claimed that Milan is the subject of a volume of poetry entitled Pop. 359 written in 1941 by Carl Wilson under the pseudonym of Tramp Starr, that book is actually about the nearby town of Moores Hill.

History
Milan was laid out in 1854 when the railroad was extended to that point. The town, like its predecessor Old Milan, was named after Milan in Italy.

Milan Masonic Lodge No. 31 was listed on the National Register of Historic Places in 2013.

Geography
Milan is located at  (39.122730, -85.130653).

Demographics

2010 census
At of the 2010 census, there were 1,899 people, 706 households and 476 families living in the town. The racial make-up of the town was 97.7% White, 0.3% African American, 0.2% Native American, 0.1% Asian, 0.3% from other races and 1.4% from two or more races. Hispanic or Latino of any race were 0.8% of the population.

There were 706 households, of which 38.7% had children under the age of 18 living with them, 44.2% were married couples living together, 16.9% had a female householder with no husband present, 6.4% had a male householder with no wife present, and 32.6% were non-families. 28.3% of all households were made up of individuals, and 14.7% had someone living alone who was 65 years of age or older. The average household size was 2.53 and the average family size was 3.06.

The median age was 36.7 years. 28.1% of residents were under the age of 18, 6.9% were between the ages of 18 and 24, 25.7% were from 25 to 44, 21.5% were from 45 to 64 and 17.9% were 65 years of age or older. The sex make-up of the town was 46.6% male and 53.4% female.

2000 census
At the 2000 census, there were 1,816 people, 693 households and 460 families living in the town. The racial make-up of the town was 98.51% White, 0.22% African American, 0.28% Native American, 0.33% Asian and 0.66% from two or more races. Hispanic or Latino of any race were 0.50% of the population.

There were 693 households, of which 33.3% had children under the age of 18 living with them, 50.5% were married couples living together, 10.2% had a female householder with no husband present, and 33.6% were non-families. 28.7% of all households were made up of individuals, and 16.5% had someone living alone who was 65 years of age or older. The average household size was 2.52 and the average family size was 3.13.

27.1% of the population were under the age of 18, 8.9% from 18 to 24, 28.3% from 25 to 44, 18.8% from 45 to 64 and 17.0% were 65 years of age or older. The median age was 34 years. For every 100 females, there were 91.2 males. For every 100 females age 18 and over, there were 85.4 males.

The median household income was $36,066 and the median family income was $41,435. Males had a median income of $31,512 and females $22,244. The per capita income was $16,191. About 7.9% of families and 9.0% of the population were below the poverty line, including 11.4% of those under age 18 and 9.0% of those age 65 or over.

Education
Milan Community School Corporation has three schools - Milan Elementary, Milan Middle and Milan High School. The corporation was a 2006 Indiana Department of Education Exemplary Progress School Corporation.

Milan has a public library, a branch of the Osgood Public Library.

Notable people
Gene White - member of the 1954 Milan High School Indiana State Championship basketball team. 
William Jordan - actor (45 year career of more than 50 notable movie and TV show credits, most notably as Major Jake Gatlin in Project U.F.O.), and member of the 1954 Milan High School Indiana State Championship basketball team.  
Bobby Plump - member of the 1954 Milan High School Indiana State Championship basketball team; "Mr. Basketball", 1954; Trester award winner, 1954; Most Valuable Player, Butler University, 1957, 1958; College Basketball All-Star Team, 1958; named one of the 50 greatest sports figures from Indiana in the 20th century, according to Sports Illustrated; Indiana Basketball Hall of Fame Inductee, 1981; author; restaurateur.  
Jamie Johnson - member of the Grascals, three time Grammy nominated with 150 appearances on the Grand Ole Opry and the 2005 International Bluegrass Music Association (IBMA) Emerging Artist of the Year Award, as well as the Song of the Year award for "Me and John and Paul"; in 2006 and 2007, they won the IBMA Entertainer of the Year award.

References

External links
 
 Milan '54 Museum, Inc.
 Milan High School

Towns in Ripley County, Indiana
Towns in Indiana